Roberta Friedman is a filmmaker and video artist. She has worked on projects ranging from the commercial, such Star Wars and Ragtime, to the experimental, such as her video The Erl King, created in collaboration with Grahame Weinbren, the first interactive art piece acquired by the Guggenheim Museum for its permanent collection.

Work
Spanning a large number of film and video productions as well as collaborations with new music artists and composers, Friedman's work has been presented extensively in the United States and Europe at the Guggenheim Museum in New York, the Whitney Museum, MOMA, the Pompidou Centre, and other venues.

A pioneer in the area of interactive media, Friedman uses film, video and digital hybrids in presenting multi filmworks, such as Straight From Bertha and the Erl King at the Whitney Biennial, the Guggenheim Museum and the Millennium Film Workshop, among others. She is currently working on a video and film project is an homage to John Cage's 49 Waltzes. With longtime collaborator Daniel Loewenthal, Friedman and Lowenthal are using Cage's concept by creating the Cosmopolis Project. A series of video installations with striking visual and sound portraits taken from the streets of Cairo, Beijing, Graz, Detroit, and New York City reflect urban cultures in transition.

Selected filmography
 49 Waltzes for the Fashion City: Milan (2017)
 Power To Heal (2017) - producer
 Bertha's Great-Grandchildren (2015) - director
 Cosmopolis: 49 Waltzes for the World (2013) - director & producer 
 Bertha's Grandchildren (2011) - director
 A Kiss for Jed Wood (2009)
 Kandinsky: A Close Look (2007)  - producer
 Here! Family (2005) - producer
 Hempsters: Plant the Seed (2003)
 Wolves of Wall Street (2002) - co-producer
 I.D. It's Dance (1986) - executive producer
 Terms of Analysis (1982) 
 The Empire Strikes Back (1980) - visual effects
 Cheap Imitations Part I: Melies - India Rubber Head (1980) 
 Cheap Imitations Part II: Madwomen (1980) 
 Cheap Imitations Part III: Point Point (1980) 
 Murray and Max Talk About Money (1979) 
 Vicarious Thrills (1979)
 Future Perfect (1978)  
 Between the Lines (1977)                                          
 Crotchets and Contrivances (1977) 
 Bertha's Children (1976) - director
 For Norma and Her Voices (1976) 
 Cross Sections (1975) 
 Siblings (1975)
 The Making of Americans (1974) 
 Amusement Park Composition & Decay (1973)

Grants, Awards and Festivals 
Friedman has received grants and awards from NYSCA, NEA, BFI, the Australian Commission and has shown her films at many festivals, including the Athens International Festival, Sinking Creek Festival, Brooklyn Film Festival, FILMEX, Millennium Film Workshop, Berlin Film Festival and the Rotterdam Film Festival.

Archive
Roberta Friedman's film collection is held by the Academy Film Archive as part of the Roberta Friedman and Grahame Weinbren Collection. The archive has preserved a number of her films, including Bertha's Children, Vicarious Thrills, and Murray and Max Talk about Money.

References

External links 
 Roberta Friedman Official Website
 The Erl King
 Roberta Friedman's Vimeo Page

American women artists
American film directors
American film producers
American video artists
Artists from New York (state)
Living people
American women film producers
Year of birth missing (living people)
21st-century American women